U.S. Route 166 (US 166) is a  east–west United States highway.  This route and US 266 are the only two remaining spurs of historic U.S. Route 66 (which was decommissioned in 1985), since US 666 was renumbered to US 491 in 2003.

US 166 meets the old route of US 66, now designated US 69 Alternate, in Baxter Springs in the southeast corner of Kansas.

Route description

|-
|KS||
|-
|MO||
|-
|Total||
|}

Kansas

US 166 is an east–west highway that meanders about  along the Kansas–Oklahoma state line. US 166's eastern terminus, which is also shared by US 400, is an intersection with I-44 just inside the Missouri state line, near the point where Kansas, Oklahoma, and Missouri meet, southwest of Joplin, Missouri near Loma Linda, MO.

A business loop connects the main US 166 route with Sedan.

The two routes turn south for a  concurrency. US 166 splits off just north of Caney turning east again through Tyro to Coffeyville. US 166 has a brief concurrency with US 169 beginning at the intersection of Walnut/Paterson Streets and Eleventh Street on the south side of downtown Coffeyville. The highway proceeds east on Eleventh Street, curves to the northeast and becomes Northeast Street. It then proceeds northeasterly past Walter Johnson Park and the Montgomery County Fairgrounds before it crosses the Verdigris River.

US 166/US 59 will run concurrently along Maple Street into downtown Chetopa. US 59 will then break off on Third Street and proceeds south towards the Kansas-Oklahoma state linesouth of the intersection. Leaving Chetopa, US 166 crosses over the Neosho River and crosses US 69 Alternate,  before Baxter Springs.

Heading east from Baxter Springs, US 166 crosses the Spring River. Approximately  later, US 166 intersects with US 400.

Missouri

History

US 166 is an original 1926 route and originally ran from South Haven to Baxter Springs, Kansas. In 1945, it was extended east through Joplin, Missouri, where it paralleled US 66 to Springfield. This extension absorbed Route 38, which had been formed in 1922 from Carthage to west of Springfield and realigned to Joplin in about 1930, with the former route becoming Route 38N and soon US 71 Alternate. In 1966, following the completion of the last section of I-44 in Missouri, the east end of US 166 was truncated back from Springfield to its current terminus. Most sections of US 166 between Joplin and Springfield were not upgraded to Interstate Highway standards and were renumbered as I-44 Business Loops, state highways (such as Route 174) or turned over to local or county jurisdiction.

In a resolution on December 22, 1993, KDOT approved and requested to realign US-166 south of Sedan, and to re-designate the former alignment as US-166 Business. This request was approved by AASHTO in a meeting on April 10, 1994.

Major intersections

Special routes

Sedan business loop

U.S. Route 166 Business (US-166 Bus.) is a  business route of US-166 that serves the city of Sedan. US-166 Bus. begins at US-166 southwest of Sedan and begins travelling northeast. The highway soon crosses Middle Caney Creek and continues northeast. It then intersects K-99 and begins to follow it east. The two routes cross Deer Creek and then enters Sedan as Main Street. US-166 Business and K-99 then turn south onto School Street and soon exit the city. The two routes cross Middle Caney Creek once again as they continue south. In a December 22, 1993 resolution, KDOT approved and requested to realign US-166 south of Sedan, and to re-designate the former alignment as US-166 Business. This request was approved by AASHTO in an April 10, 1994 meeting.

Major intersections

Joplin
 U.S. Route 166 Business – Joplin, Missouri (decommissioned)

Springfield
 U.S. Route 166 Business – Springfield, Missouri (decommissioned)
 U.S. Route 166 City - Springfield, Missouri (decommissioned)
 U.S. Route 166 Truck - Springfield, Missouri (decommissioned)

See also

References

External links

 
 Endpoints of US highway 166

United States Numbered Highway System
U.S. Highways in Kansas
U.S. Highways in Missouri
1
U.S. Route 166
U.S. Route 166
U.S. Route 166
U.S. Route 166
U.S. Route 166
U.S. Route 166
U.S. Route 166